Hindusthan Samachar is the first multilingual news agency in India subscribed by more than 200 newspapers and almost all the news channels including Door Darshan (DD). It was set up in 1948 by S. S. Apte, offering its services in 10 languages: Bengali, Odia, Assamese, Telugu, Malayalam, Urdu, Punjabi, Gujarati, Hindi and Marathi. In 1951 the Government of Bihar subscribed to the Hindustan Samachar, followed by many states in India. All India Radio and Radio Nepal were once subscribers. A year after a state of emergency was declared in India in 1975, Hindustan Samachar was merged with Press Trust of India, United News of India and Samachar Bharati to form the media monopoly Samachar.

References

Bibliography

Further reading
Noise In The Wires, Outlook India, 21 January 2002
Best of times for the RSS, it aims for makeover at 90, Hindustan Times, 12 October 2014

External links
 Hindustan Samachar (Hindi)
 Hindustan Samachar (English)

Mass media companies established in 1948
News agencies based in India